Daniel Yule (born 18 February 1993) is a Swiss World Cup alpine ski racer and specializes in slalom. Born in Martigny, Valais, he is of Scottish parentage.

Racing career
Yule rose quickly to make his World Cup debut in the 2012 season in Kitzbühel at the age of 18, he had achieved his first points at the European Cup level just a month earlier. Having had a year of solid results in the European Cup in 2013, he became a World Cup regular for the 2014 season.

2014
After earning his first European Cup victory in the early 2014 season, Yule achieved his first World Cup points in the third slalom of the year, a race that was moved to Bormio, where he took 17 place. The breakthrough result came on the same piste on which he had made his World Cup debut. With a start number of 41, Yule finished 30th after the first run, meaning he was the last person to qualify for a second. In that second run, Yule took 4 tenths of a second out of the rest of the field, which catapulted him up the order to eventual 7th position. This result was enough to earn him a place on the Swiss Olympic Team in Sochi, where he competed in the slalom. Twelfth after the first run, Yule was disqualified in the second. After the Olympics, Yule went to his first Junior World Championships, where he earned a Bronze Medal in the slalom.

2015
The 2015 season was to be the first which Yule concentrated on the World Cup, although Yule did claim back-to-back victories in the two European Cup slaloms in Chamonix. He was able to find consistency in his skiing at the World Cup level, achieving points in 7 of the first 8 races of the season. Yule finished tenth three times; in Levi, Zagreb, and Schladming. and with those results, he fulfilled the selection criteria for the World Championships. His run in the slalom at the Championships ended very quickly, as he skied out of the course after only three gates. Yule's season results were enough to qualify for the World Cup Finals for the first time, and he finished the slalom tour in 16th as highest ranked Swiss in the discipline.

2016
Yule began the year promisingly with a ninth place in the first slalom of the season in Val-d'Isère after the season opener in Levi was cancelled.

2018
During the 2018 season, Yule took his first World Cup podium finishes, taking third at both Kitzbühel and Schladming.

2019
Yule started his 2019 season with a fifth place in Levi and a sixth in Saalbach-Hinterglemm. He earned his first win on the World Cup circuit in the Madonna di Campiglio night slalom after finishing fourth in the first run. He benefited from both Marcel Hirscher and Henrik Kristoffersen straddling. Yule's victory was the first World Cup slalom win for a Swiss male skier since Marc Gini's first place in Reiteralm in November 2007.

World Cup results

Season standings

Race podiums
 6 wins – (6 SL)
 15 podiums – (15 SL)

World Championship results

Olympic results

References

External links
 
 
 Daniel Yule at the Swiss Ski Team 
  

1993 births
Living people
Alpine skiers at the 2014 Winter Olympics
Alpine skiers at the 2018 Winter Olympics
Alpine skiers at the 2022 Winter Olympics
Swiss male alpine skiers
Olympic alpine skiers of Switzerland
Swiss people of British descent
Swiss people of Scottish descent
Medalists at the 2018 Winter Olympics
Olympic medalists in alpine skiing
Olympic gold medalists for Switzerland
People from Martigny
Sportspeople from Valais